The 1987 Philippine Basketball Association (PBA) Open Conference was the first conference of the 1987 PBA season. It started on March 22 and ended on June 23, 1987. The tournament is an Import-laden format, which requires an import or a pure-foreign player for each team.

Format
The following format will be observed for the duration of the conference:
 Double-round robin eliminations; 12 games per team; Teams are then seeded by basis on win–loss records.
 #1 and #2 teams automatically advance to the semifinals. 
 Teams seeded #3, #4, #5 and #6 will dispute in the last two semifinals berth in a one round-robin quarterfinals (results from the eliminations will be carried over). 
 Semifinals will be two round robin affairs
The top two teams in the semifinals advance to the best of seven finals. The last two teams dispute the third-place trophy in a best of seven playoff.

Elimination round

Quarterfinals

Semifinals

Results

Third place playoffs

Finals

References

PBA Open Conference
Open Conference